Is Matrimony a Failure? is a 1922 American silent comedy film directed by James Cruze and written by Walter Woods based upon a play of the same name by Leo Ditrichstein, which itself was an adaptation of the German play Die Tür ins Freie by Oscar Blumenthal and Gustav Kadelburg. The film stars T. Roy Barnes, Lila Lee, Lois Wilson, Walter Hiers, ZaSu Pitts, Arthur Hoyt, and Lillian Leighton. The film was released on April 16, 1922, by Paramount Pictures. It is not known whether the film currently survives, which suggests that it is a lost film.

Cast 
T. Roy Barnes as Arthur Haviland
Lila Lee as Margaret Saxby
Lois Wilson as Mabel Hoyt
Walter Hiers as Jack Hoyt
ZaSu Pitts as Mrs. Wilbur
Arthur Hoyt as Mr. Wilbur
Lillian Leighton as Martha Saxby
Tully Marshall as Amos Saxby
Adolphe Menjou as Dudley King
Sylvia Ashton as Mrs. Pearson
Charles Stanton Ogle as Pop Skinner
Ethel Wales as Mrs. Skinner
Sidney Bracey as Bank President
William Gonder as Policeman
Lottie Williams as Maid
Dan Mason as Silas Spencer
William H. Brown as Chef 
Robert Brower as Marriage License Clerk

References

External links

lantern slide 

1922 films
1920s English-language films
Silent American comedy films
Paramount Pictures films
Films directed by James Cruze
American black-and-white films
American silent feature films
American films based on plays
1922 comedy films
1920s American films